Candalides cuprea is a species of butterfly of the family Lycaenidae. It was described by Röber in 1886. It is found in the western part of West Irian.

References

Candalidini
Butterflies described in 1886
Taxa named by Julius Röber